The following lists events in the year 2019 in Belize.

Incumbents
 Monarch: Elizabeth II
 Prime Minister: Dean Barrow
 Governor-General: Colville Young

Events

8 May – The 2019 Belizean territorial dispute referendum (regarding the Belizean–Guatemalan territorial dispute) was held (originally scheduled for 10 April). Voters were asked whether the territorial dispute should be referred to the International Court of Justice, and the proposal was approved by 55% of the voters.

Deaths

2 March – Derek Aikman, politician (b. 1959).

See also
 	

 		
 Belize at the 2019 Pan American Games

References

 
2010s in Belize
Years of the 21st century in Belize
Belize
Belize